Tacoma was an Amtrak train station in Tacoma, Washington, United States. It was served by Amtrak's Cascades and Coast Starlight lines. The building was constructed in 1984 to a standard design that Amtrak developed in the 1970s and used at locations throughout the country for the next two decades. The station was replaced by a new Amtrak facility at Tacoma Dome Station, an existing commuter rail and light rail hub, that opened in 2017; however, it was reopened 24 hours after closing due to the 2017 Washington train derailment on the new line to the new station. The station remained in service until the Point Defiance Bypass was reopened to Amtrak trains on November 18, 2021.

Construction

The station was constructed to replace Union Station, as the planned construction of the Tacoma Spur (Interstate 705)  would remove its tracks, preventing passenger trains from accessing Union Station. Ground broke on the new station's building in 1983. It would cost $953,000 to construct using funds from the state government to reimburse the Burlington Northern Railroad for the retirement of Union Station and relocation of nearby tracks. Amtrak service began at the new station on June 14, 1984.

Description

The one-story building was constructed to design 75C of the Amtrak Standard Stations Program. Features of the Tacoma station which were standard for stations of the Amtrak Standard Stations Program included brick walls, floor-to-ceiling windows, and a flat cantilevered roof. The building measured , and was designed to be expandable, should demand warrant it. It was designed to accommodate 75 people at a time, with seating for 48 people.

Replacement

WSDOT adopted long-term plans in the 1990s to relocate the Amtrak station to a new hub at Freighthouse Square, where Sound Transit had begun construction of the Tacoma Dome commuter rail station. After a plan from 2013 to build a new station in the west end of the building was rejected due to public criticism of the design, the state of Washington in 2015 completed a new design, placing the station in the center of the building. In March 2016, the state reached an agreement to purchase the required part of the building and demolish it to make way for the new station, with construction to begin in June 2016.

Amtrak trains were rerouted away from Tacoma's shoreline and onto a new inland cutoff route, the Point Defiance Bypass, which opened with the new station on December 18, 2017. The station is located in the Freighthouse Square building, a former warehouse rebuilt into a collection of small businesses and eateries near the Tacoma Dome. The trains were re-routed back onto the original route after a major derailment on the bypass near DuPont, Washington on that same day.

The Puyallup Avenue station remained in use until the Point Defiance Bypass was re-opened to Amtrak service on November 18, 2021.

Boardings and alightings

References

Former Amtrak stations in Washington (state)
Bus stations in Washington (state)
Buildings and structures in Tacoma, Washington
Transportation in Tacoma, Washington
Railway stations in the United States opened in 1984
Railway stations closed in 2021
Railway stations in Pierce County, Washington
1984 establishments in Washington (state)